Flax newbritaini is a moth of the family Erebidae first described by Michael Fibiger in 2011. It is found in Papua New Guinea (it was described from New Britain within the Bismarck Islands).

The wingspan is about 11 mm. The labial palps, head, patagia, basal part of tegulae and thorax are beige, suffused with a few light-brown scales. The forewings (including fringes) are beige, with light-brown subterminal and terminal areas. The base of the costa and the quadrangular patch in upper medial area are brown, with a black dot in the inner lower area. The crosslines are light brown. The subterminal line is brown and the terminal line is only indicated by brown interveinal dots. The hindwings are light grey without a discal spot. The underside of the forewings is unicolorous brown and the underside of the hindwings is grey with a discal spot.

References

Micronoctuini
Moths described in 2011
Taxa named by Michael Fibiger